Chris Mason is an American Christian singer-songwriter. Raised in the outskirts of Atlanta, Mason attended Berry College in Rome, Georgia, majoring in Family Counseling until graduating in 2001.

After graduating he began his musical career, releasing his first album Not So Gracefully (2001). After touring for two years, he settled in Nashville, Tennessee and began work on his second release, Crowded Spaces (2003), which was produced with the help of Andrew Osenga and Cason Cooley, both former members of the band The Normals.

In 2006, he released an EP, Songs One Through Six, again working with Osenga and Cooley. That year Mason also co-founded the Square Peg Alliance with 12 other independent Christian artists.

Discography
 Songs One Through Six (EP) (2006)
 Crowded Spaces (2003)
 Not So Gracefully (2001)

See also
The Square Peg Alliance

Notes and references

External links
ChrisMasonMusic.com, his official website.
Squarepegalliance.com, the official Square Peg Alliance website.
Squarepegalliance.net, popular fansite of the Square Peg Alliance.

American performers of Christian music
Living people
Year of birth missing (living people)
Performers of contemporary Christian music
Place of birth missing (living people)